Philippe Camus may refer to:

Philippe Camus (businessman) (born 1948), French businessman
Philippe Camus (writer), 15th-century writer